A Ghanaian smock is a plaid shirt that is similar to the dashiki, worn by both women and men in Ghana. It is the most popular traditional attire in Ghana. The smock is called Bingmaa in Dagbani language, Bun-nwↃ or Bana by Mamprusis, fugu in Mosi,  batakari in the southern regions,  in Frafra, and Banaa in Kusaal both in the upper east region. It is worn by Royals and civilians across Dagbon and other northern regions, but popular across Ghana. The smock originated in the northern region of Ghana but widely used in West Africa and diasporans across the world. The smock is not unlike the national attire of Burkina Faso known as faso dan fadi.

The smock and Kente cloth are the national dress of Ghana. Kente cloth originated in the southern region of Ghana.

The smock is made of hand-loomed strips popularly called Strip Cloths. They are made  of a mixture of dyed and undyed cotton loom, and are originally from the northern part of Ghana and other parts of West Africa.  The strips are sewn together by hand or machine giving the smock a plaid appearance.  
Most smocks have embroidery on the neckline.  The smock is worn with a kufi cap. However, chiefs in Ghana wear the smock with a red fez hat.

The smock in the West
Historically, the smock was rarely seen in the West. As recently as the 1990s, immigrants from Ghana were the only individuals seen wearing the smock.  All of that changed as the popularity of films produced in Ghana increased among Black Americans and Caribbeans.  In recent years people of African descent have started wearing smocks to churches, mosques, African festivals, and Kwanzaa celebrations in major Western cities like New York and Kingston, Jamaica.

Popular culture
A man is seen wearing a smock in the opening scene of the Jackie Aygemang movie, I Knew Nothing Till You Taught Me.

See also
Dashiki
Kente cloth
Kufi
National costume

References

External links

 I Knew Nothing Until You Taught Me on DVD.
 Buying a smock
 Kente Cloth

Tops (clothing)
African clothing
Woven fabrics